Preston Center is a commercial center in north Dallas, Texas (USA), located around the intersection of Preston Road (State Highway 289) and Northwest Highway (Loop 12).

The area has been a premier retail center in Dallas since its development in the 1950s, though the nearby NorthPark Center has provided significant competition.

University Park is to the south, a string of condos along Northwest Highway is to the east, and the Preston Hollow neighborhood is to the north.

The development includes two 20-story office towers that opened during a construction boom of the late 1970s and early 1980s. As of 1989 many of the Preston Center buildings were partially vacant. During that year Terry Box of The Dallas Morning News said that the vacant buildings were perceived by residents of nearby Preston Hollow as "intrusive symbols of the city's failure to control its growth" and "have come to exemplify much of what is wrong with North Dallas." Around that time residents tried to pressure area politicians into making the development more low-rise and further removed from the Preston Hollow community.

 the families of many property owners had already owned the properties for some time.

A municipal-owned parking garage serves Preston Center developments as the city is obligated to provide parking.

 several owners of Preston Center developments oppose redevelopment as it would interrupt their cash flow in the short term.

References

External links
 Directory of Preston Center Businesses
 Pictures of Preston Center from DallasSky.com
 President Bush to Rent $300,000 a Year Dallas Office Space